Chebenki (also given as Cheben'ki, Orenburg Northeast, and Dmitrievka) is an air base in Russia located 38 km northeast of Orenburg.  It has revetted areas for 15 fighters, 8 large aircraft, and considerable tarmac space.

The base was served by 118 OVE (118th Independent Helicopter Squadron) flying Mil Mi-8 and Mil Mi-24 helicopters between 1972 and 2007.  The base has had an Sukhoi Su-17 and Mikoyan-Gurevich MiG-23 attack aircraft presence during the Cold War.

The base is now used as storage for unused aircraft and helicopters.

References

External links
RussianAirFields.com

Soviet Air Force bases
Soviet Frontal Aviation
Russian Air Force bases